Harrison Township is one of the 25 townships of Licking County, Ohio, United States. As of the 2010 census the population was 7,561, up from 6,494 at the 2000 census. 7,036 of the population in 2010 lived in the unincorporated portions of the township.

Geography
Located on the southern edge of the county, it borders the following townships and city:
St. Albans Township - north
Granville Township - northeast corner
Union Township - east
Walnut Township, Fairfield County - southeast corner
Liberty Township, Fairfield County - south
Etna Township - southwest
Pataskala - west
Jersey Township - northwest corner

Several populated places are located in Harrison Township:
The village of Kirkersville, in the south
The census-designated place of Beechwood Trails, in the northwest

Name and history
It is one of nineteen Harrison Townships statewide.

Government
The township is governed by a three-member board of trustees, who are elected in November of odd-numbered years to a four-year term beginning on the following January 1. Two are elected in the year after the presidential election and one is elected in the year before it. There is also an elected township fiscal officer, who serves a four-year term beginning on April 1 of the year after the election, which is held in November of the year before the presidential election. Vacancies in the fiscal officership or on the board of trustees are filled by the remaining trustees.

References

External links

County website

Townships in Licking County, Ohio
Townships in Ohio